Pseudograpsus setosus is a species of edible crab endemic to the coasts of Chile, Ecuador and Peru; it is a benthic predator that lives in the subtidal and intertidal zones in temperate waters from sea levels down to depths of . Its diet consists of clams, picorocos and other crabs. Its geographic distribution ranges from the equator in Ecuador to the Taitao Peninsula at 47° S.

References

Grapsoidea
Crustaceans of the eastern Pacific Ocean
Crustaceans described in 1798